Nothing Left Unsaid: Gloria Vanderbilt & Anderson Cooper is a 2016 documentary film about Gloria Vanderbilt and Anderson Cooper.

References

External links
 

2016 television films
2016 films
Anderson Cooper
HBO documentary films
2010s American films